Cowichan Valley Regional Transit System is a public bus service in Duncan and the Cowichan Valley of British Columbia, Canada. The conventional transit of the Cowichan Valley Transit System has been in service since 1993. handyDART is a transportation service for people with a disability who are unable to use conventional transit, which is operated by Volunteer Cowichan.

Services
There is a weekday commuter service between Duncan, Cobble Hill, Mill Bay, Shawnigan Lake, and Victoria. Buses leave the Cowichan Valley in the morning and return in the evening. They travel via the Malahat. Funding for the service, which started operating on October 20, 2008 is provided by Cowichan Valley Regional District, Victoria Regional Transit and BC Transit.

Routes

Regional routes

Commuter routes

References

External links
Cowichan Valley Regional Transit System at BCTransit.com
Cowichan Valley Commuter Transit System

Duncan, British Columbia
Cowichan Valley Regional District
Bus transport in British Columbia
Transit agencies in British Columbia